Dorothea Wolbert (April 12, 1874 – September 15, 1958) was an American film actress. She appeared in more than 140 films between 1916 and 1957. She appeared on the television series I Love Lucy (with her character named Dorothea Wolbert) in episode #137, "Ricky's European Booking" (1956). She was born in Philadelphia, Pennsylvania and died in Hollywood, California.

Selected filmography

 A Man of Sorrow (1916) - Sarah
 Luke Wins Ye Ladye Faire (1917, Short)
 Lonesome Luke's Lively Life (1917, Short)
 Lonesome Luke on Tin Can Alley (1917, Short)
 Lonesome Luke's Honeymoon (1917, Short)
 Lonesome Luke, Messenger (1917, Short)
 Lonesome Luke, Mechanic (1917, Short)
 Lonesome Luke's Wild Women (1917, Short)
 Over the Fence (1917, Short)
 Pinched (1917, Short)
 By the Sad Sea Waves (1917, Short) - Old Maid Bather in Shower (uncredited)
 Birds of a Feather (1917, Short)
 From Laramie to London (1917, Short)
 Love, Laughs and Lather (1917, Short)
 All Aboard (1917, Short)
 We Never Sleep (1917, Short)
 The Big Idea (1917, Short) - Old Maid with XX Skirt (uncredited)
 The Tip (1918, Short)
 The Lamb (1918, Short)
 Beat It (1918, Short)
 Look Pleasant, Please (1918, Short) - Old Maid Customer (uncredited)
 Here Come the Girls (1918, Short)
 Let's Go (1918, Short)
 Follow the Crowd (1918, Short)
 Pipe the Whiskers (1918, Short)
 Hey There! (1918, Short)
 Kicked Out (1918, Short)
 The Non-Stop Kid (1918, Short)
 Two-Gun Gussie (1918, Short) - An Admirer (uncredited)
 Fireman Save My Child (1918, Short)
 Sic 'Em, Towser (1918, Short)
 Somewhere in Turkey (1918, Short)
 No Place Like Jail (1918, Short)
 Just Rambling Along (1918, Short)
 The Dawn of Understanding (1918) - Mrs. Prescott
 Hear 'Em Rave (1918, Short)
 She Loves Me Not (1918, Short)
 Do You Love Your Wife? (1919, Short)
 The Enchanted Barn (1919) - Mrs. Hollister
 Hustling for Health (1919, Short)
 Ask Father (1919, Short) - Minor Role (uncredited)
 On the Fire (1919, Short)
 Hoots Mon! (1919, Short)
 I'm on My Way (1919, Short)
 The Dutiful Dub (1919, Short)
 Jazz and Jailbirds (1919, Short)
 Next Aisle Over (1919, Short) - Old Maid Passerby on Street (uncredited)
 Young Mr. Jazz (1919, Short)
 Ring Up the Curtain (1919, Short)
 Si, Senor (1919, Short)
 The Marathon (1919, Short) - The Rich Girl's Mother (uncredited)
 Pistols for Breakfast (1919, Short)
 Swat the Crook (1919, Short)
 Off the Trolley (1919, Short)
 The Solitary Sin (1919, Short)
 Cupid Forecloses (1919) - Mrs. Farleigh
 Smashing Barriers (1919, Short)
 At the Old Stage Door (1919, Short)
 La La Lucille (1920) - Fannie, the Janitor's Wife
 Pink Tights (1920) - Mrs. Bump
 A Beggar in Purple (1920) - Mrs. Grogan
 Action (1921) - Mirandy Meekin
 The Ruse of the Rattler (1921) - Mrs. Bludgeon
 The Little Minister (1922) - Nanny Webster
 The Ninety and Nine (1922) - Mrs. Markham
 The Flirt (1922) - The Cook
 The Abysmal Brute (1923) - Mrs. MacTavish
 The Gown Shop (1923, Short) - Audience member
 A Lady of Quality (1924) - Mistress Wimpole
 The Galloping Ace (1924) - Susie Williams
 The Guilty One (1924) - Anne (the maid)
 Duped (1925) - Sweet Marie
 West of Mojave (1925)
 A Woman of the World (1925) - Annie
 Pleasures of the Rich (1926) - Maggie the Maid
 Shivering Spooks (1926, Short) - Séance attendee
 The College Boob (1926) - Aunt Polly
 Exit Smiling (1926) - Anna (uncredited)
 Snowbound (1927) - Maid
 A Sailor's Sweetheart (1927) - Lena Svenson
 The Battle of the Century (1927, Short) - Warring pedestrian (uncredited)
 Love and Learn (1928) - Maid
 Anybody Here Seen Kelly? (1928) - Slavey
 Dangerous Paradise (1930) - Mrs. Schomberg
 The Medicine Man (1930) - Sister Wilson
 Borrowed Wives (1930) - Aunt Mary Foley
 The Front Page (1931) - Jenny
 Too Many Cooks (1931) - Aunt Emma Cook (uncredited)
 Friends and Lovers (1931) - Bertha the Barmaid (uncredited)
 The Beast of the City (1932) - Shoplifter (uncredited)
 The Expert (1932) - Annie
 Two Seconds (1932) - Lizzie - Cleaning Lady
 Hallelujah, I'm a Bum (1933) - Apple Mary
 Child of Manhattan (1933) - Dulcey's Aide Getting Chinchilla Coat (uncredited)
 The Mayor of Hell (1933) - Mrs. Burns (uncredited)
 The Women in His Life (1933) - Charwoman (uncredited)
 The Scarlet Letter (1934) - Mistress Allerton (uncredited)
 The Painted Veil (1934) - Stuttering Woman (scenes deleted)
 Vagabond Lady (1935) - Woman Given Opera Ticket (uncredited)
 Motive for Revenge (1935) - Annie - Maid
 Paris in Spring (1935) - Francine
 Reckless Roads (1935)
 Heir to Trouble (1935) - Tillie Tilks
 Fury (1936) - Hector's Wife (uncredited)
 Postal Inspector (1936) - Mrs. Coates (uncredited)
 The Emperor's Candlesticks (1937) - Bidder (uncredited)
 Three Comrades (1938) - Old Nurse (uncredited)
 The Arkansas Traveler (1938) - Old Lady (uncredited)
 Dramatic School (1938) - Flower Woman (uncredited)
 Within the Law (1939) - Minor Role (uncredited)
 They All Come Out (1939) - Psychiatrist's Nurse (uncredited)
 The Night of Nights (1939) - 2nd Pencil Woman (uncredited)
 Invisible Stripes (1939) - Flower Woman (uncredited)
 Abe Lincoln in Illinois (1940) - Woman in Store (uncredited)
 The Captain Is a Lady (1940) - Short Old Lady (uncredited)
 The Gay Sisters (1942) - Woman Pushed Away by Policeman (uncredited)
 Crack-Up (1946) - Old Lady (uncredited)
 Three Husbands (1950) - Cleaning Woman (uncredited)
 Little Egypt (1951) - Old Lady (uncredited)
 Hot Blood (1956) - Little Old Gypsy Woman (uncredited)
 Funny Face (1957) - Minor Role (uncredited)

References

External links

1874 births
1958 deaths
American film actresses
American silent film actresses
Actresses from Philadelphia
20th-century American actresses